Zatrephes iridescens is a moth in the family Erebidae. It was described by Walter Rothschild in 1910. It is found in French Guiana and Brazil.

Subspecies
Zatrephes iridescens iridescens (Brazil)
Zatrephes iridescens pura Dognin, 1921 (French Guiana)

References

Phaegopterina
Moths described in 1910